Semi Valemei (born 20 January 1999) is a Fijian professional rugby league footballer who plays as a er for the Canberra Raiders in the NRL and Fiji at international level.

Background
Born in Labasa, Fiji, Valemei attended Seaqaqa Central College and Natabua High School, where he played rugby union. 

In 2017, he was scouted by former NRL player Wise Kativerata and moved to Australia to play rugby league. He moved to the Sunshine Coast, Queensland, playing for the Caloundra Sharks before being signed by the Canberra Raiders.

Playing career
In 2018, Valemei played for the Raiders' Jersey Flegg Cup feeder side, Mounties. In 2019, he played for Mounties in the New South Wales Cup and for the Raiders in the Jersey Flegg Cup, scoring a hat-trick in their Grand Final loss to the South Sydney Rabbitohs. In October 2019, he represented Fiji at the 2019 Rugby League World Cup 9s.

2020
In Round 10 of the 2020 NRL season, Valemei was named to make his NRL debut against the Sydney Roosters.

He played in all three of Canberra's finals matches including the preliminary final defeat to Melbourne.  He played a total of ten games in his debut season.

2021
Valemei made 11 appearances for Canberra in the 2021 NRL season which saw the club finish 10th on the table and miss out on the finals.

References

External links
Canberra Raiders profile
NRL profile
Fiji profile

1999 births
Living people
Canberra Raiders players
Fiji national rugby league team players
Fijian rugby league players
Mount Pritchard Mounties players
Rugby league wingers
People from Labasa